Borve or Borbh is a crofting township on the Isle of Skye, Scotland.

Dun Borve
Dun Borve [dùn is 'fort' in Gaelic] is an ancient fort, that was considered a fairy dwelling. When local villagers shouted, The fairies' fort is on fire!, the fairies all fled. The fairies left for good when they found out that they had been tricked.

References

Populated places in the Isle of Skye